Patricio Toranzo (born 19 March 1982 in Buenos Aires) is a retired Argentine football player, who played as an attacking midfielder or a winger.

Career

Club career
Toranzo made his professional debut for Club Atlético River Plate in a league match against Racing Club de Avellaneda on 3 June 2004.

After stints with Quilmes and Atlético de Rafaela he joined Huracán in 2007.

International career
Toranzo made his debut for the Argentina national team after being called up to join Diego Maradona's squad of local league call-ups who beat Jamaica 2-1 on 10 February 2010.

External links

 Argentine Primera statistics

1982 births
Living people
Footballers from Buenos Aires
Association football midfielders
Argentine footballers
Argentine expatriate footballers
Argentina international footballers
Club Atlético River Plate footballers
Quilmes Atlético Club footballers
Club Atlético Huracán footballers
Atlético de Rafaela footballers
Racing Club de Avellaneda footballers
All Boys footballers
Club Almagro players
Shanghai Shenhua F.C. players
Argentine Primera División players
Primera Nacional players
Chinese Super League players
Argentine expatriate sportspeople in China
Argentine expatriate sportspeople in Bolivia
Expatriate footballers in China
Expatriate footballers in Bolivia